is a railway station located in the city of Izunokuni, Shizuoka Prefecture, Japan operated by the private railroad company Izuhakone Railway.

Lines
Makinokō Station is served by the Sunzu Line, and is located 8.5 kilometers from the starting point of the line at Mishima Station.

Station layout
Baraki Station has two opposed side platforms connected to the station building by a level crossing. Platform 2 is the primary platform, and is used for bidirectional traffic. Platform 1 is in occasional use only. The station building is unattended and has automatic ticket machines.

Platforms

History 
Baraki Station was opened on May 20, 1898 as part of the initial construction phase of the Sunzu Line.

Passenger statistics
In fiscal 2017, the station was used by an average of 342 passengers daily (boarding passengers only).

Surrounding area
The station is located in a residential area.

See also
 List of Railway Stations in Japan

References

External links

 Official home page

Railway stations in Japan opened in 1898
Railway stations in Shizuoka Prefecture
Izuhakone Sunzu Line
Izunokuni